Erich Grether (27 August 1924 – 16 March 2007) was a Swiss footballer who played for FC Basel. He played mainly as a forward, but also as a midfielder. 

Grether joined Basel's first team in their 1947–48 season under player-manager Ernst Hufschmid. After just one test match, Grether played his domestic league debut for the club in the home game at the Landhof on 30 November 1947 as Basel were defeated 0–1 by Lugano. He scored his first Basel goal 22 February 1948 as Basel beat Servette 3–2 at home.

Between 1947 and 1951 Grether played 24 games for Basel scoring seven goals; 15 of the games were in the Nationalliga A and 9 were friendly games. He scored four goals in the domestic league and the other three were scored during the test games.

References

Sources
 Rotblau: Jahrbuch Saison 2017/2018. Publisher: FC Basel Marketing AG. 
 Die ersten 125 Jahre. Publisher: Josef Zindel im Friedrich Reinhardt Verlag, Basel. 
 Verein "Basler Fussballarchiv" Homepage

FC Basel players
Swiss men's footballers
Association football forwards
1924 births
2007 deaths